The 2007 Just Car Insurance 500 was an endurance motor race for V8 Supercars, held on the weekend of the 14 to 16 September at the Sandown International Raceway in Victoria, Australia.  The race, which was the 40th Sandown 500, was the ninth round of the 2007 V8 Supercar Championship Series.

The race was won by Jamie Whincup and Craig Lowndes, driving a Ford Falcon BF for Team Vodafone.

Results

Qualifying
Qualifying and the Top Ten Shootout were held on Saturday, 15 September 2007.

Race
The race was held on Sunday, 16 September 2007.

References

External links
 Race results, Just Car Insurance 500, 16 September 2007, racing.natsoft.com.au, as archived at web.archive.org

Just Car Insurance Sandown 500
Motorsport at Sandown
Pre-Bathurst 500